Hagal is the informal name of a dune field on Mars located below the north pole of Mars. Its name derives from the sand dunes in Frank Herbert's novel Dune and the fictional planet Hagal. It is located at coordinates 78.0° N latitude, 84.0° E longitude, and consists of linear and round dunes with a southeast slipface orientation. It was one of the dune formations targeted for imaging by the HiRISE camera, on board the Mars Reconnaissance Orbiter, at the rate of one image every six weeks. in the third year (MY31–Mars Year 31) of its seasonal expedition. It is also known as the "Martian Morse Code" due to the linear and rounded formations of its dunes, which have the appearance of dots and dashes.

Formation 

Although normally it is possible to obtain information about the wind direction from the orientation and form of sand dunes, the complexity of shapes of the Hagal dunes makes it difficult to determine the direction of the forming winds. In the case of the Hagal dunes, it is theorised that a local circular crater, probably formed due to meteorite impact and filled with sand, has decreased the quantity of dune-forming sand; this, in turn, impacted the local topography, causing a change in wind patterns. 

The linear dunes (dashes) were formed through the action of bidirectional winds, acting perpendicular to the line of the sand dune, causing a funneling effect directing the sand to accumulate along the linear axis of the dune. The round-shaped dunes (dots) were formed when the winds that caused the linearly-shaped accumulations were interrupted. The round dunes are classified as "barchanoid dunes". However, the exact mechanism of either formation is still unknown and this is the reason the area was chosen for imaging by the HiRISE mission.

Veronica Bray, HiRISE camera targeting specialist, commented that there are similarly shaped dunes in other locations on Mars, but the Hagal field provides better images of these shapes due to the uncommon characteristics of its topography. Bray also decoded the "Morse Code" of a formation as "NEE NED ZB 6TNN DEIBEDH SIEFI EBEEE SSIEI ESEE SEEE !!".

Images by HiRISE

See also 
 Classical albedo features on Mars
 Abalos Undae 
 Nili Patera dune field
 Olympia Undae
 Hyperboreae Undae
 Siton Undae
 Aspledon Undae
 Ogygis Undae

References

External links
Martian Morse Code by UAHiRISE on Youtube

Dunes on Mars
Mare Boreum quadrangle